Football 5-a-side at the 2004 Summer Paralympics took place at the Olympic Hockey Centre in Athens.

Each team had four blind players and one sighted or visually impaired goalkeeper, with five substitutes allowed. Matches were 25 minutes each way. In the play-off matches, two ten-minute periods of extra time and a penalty shoot-out were added as necessary when the scores were tied. In the final, Brazil beat Argentina 3–2 in a shoot-out.

Results

Preliminaries

Final round

Gold medal match

Bronze medal match

Classification 5/6

Team lists

See also
Football at the 2004 Summer Olympics

References

 
2004 Summer Paralympics events
2004